Albert Victor Hyde (3 June 1907 – 23 October 1989) was an Australian rules footballer who played with Hawthorn in the VFL.

Family
The son of Arthur James Hyde (1879-1949), and Alice Frances Louisa Hyde (1867-1956), née Letch, Albert Victor Hyde was born at Brunswick East, Victoria on 3 June 1907.

Football

Brunswick (VFA)
Recruited from East Brunswick, he played in 10 First XVII matches (scoring 5 goals) with Brunswick Football Club in 1924.

Hawthorn (VFL)
Hyde was a full-forward and was Hawthorn's major goal-kicker during their first decade in the VFL: he topped their goal-kicking from 1926–1930, with a best of 62 goals in 1928 to finish third in the VFL's goal-kicking — an impressive feat considering that Hawthorn finished last without a win. His last couple of seasons at Hawrthorn were spent at full back.

Victoria (VFL)
He is the only player to have been selected to represent the VFL at both full-forward (1928), and at full-back (1933).

Preston (VFA)
Hyde became captain-coach of Preston Football Club on 21 December 1935; and, during his first season at Preston (1936) he was joint winner of the Recorder Cup. He retired at the end of 1937.

Athlete
Running as the favourite, he came second (by a foot) to R.L. Barker in the 1932 Stawell Gift final.

After football

Later, Hyde was a businessman in Melbourne. In 1965 he was appointed President of the Metropolitan Football League.

Death
He died on 23 October 1989 and is buried at Rye Cemetery.

See also
• 1933 Sydney Carnival

Honours and achievements
Individual
 5× Hawthorn leading goalkicker: 1926, 1927, 1928, 1929, 1930
 Recorder Cup: 1936
 Hawthorn Hall of Fame
 Hawthorn life member

Notes

References
 Stawell Gift Try-Outs: Colac Carnival: A.V. Hyde Wins Gift, The Herald, (Saturday, 19 March 1932), p.3.

External links

 A.V. "Bert" Hyde, at The VFA Project.
 
 

1907 births
1989 deaths
Australian male sprinters
Australian rules footballers from Melbourne
Brunswick Football Club players
Hawthorn Football Club players
Preston Football Club (VFA) players
Preston Football Club (VFA) coaches
J. J. Liston Trophy winners
Hawthorn Football Club administrators
People from Brunswick, Victoria
Burials in Victoria (Australia)